Dromore West is a village in County Sligo, Ireland.

Dromore West is situated on the Dunneil River and sits between the Ox Mountains and the Atlantic coast. A river walk runs from just below the petrol station towards the sea. There is an old Napoleonic tower at the top of Ballykilcash hill, on the Wild Atlantic Way, near the village.

There are four public houses in the village, though not all open throughout the week. There are also two shops, a restaurant, a chemist, a hairdresser, health centre, bakery, Chinese takeaway, butcher and a post office and florist. The old parish church, near the school in Leharrow, had been replaced by a modern one close to the village on the Easkey road.  There are two Christian churches - one Anglican and one Roman Catholic - in the village.

People
Patrick Collins RHA, 1911 - 1994, was born in Dromore West.

See also
 List of towns and villages in Ireland

References

External links
 Dromore West Website

Towns and villages in County Sligo